Courtly love was a medieval European literary conception of love that emphasized nobility and chivalry. Medieval literature is filled with examples of knights setting out on adventures and performing various deeds or services for ladies because of their "courtly love". This kind of love is originally a literary fiction created for the entertainment of the nobility, but as time passed, these ideas about love changed and attracted a larger audience. In the high Middle Ages, a "game of love" developed around these ideas as a set of social practices. "Loving nobly" was considered to be an enriching and improving practice.

Courtly love began in the ducal and princely courts of Aquitaine, Provence, Champagne, ducal Burgundy and the Norman Kingdom of Sicily at the end of the eleventh century. In essence, courtly love was an experience between erotic desire and spiritual attainment, "a love at once illicit and morally elevating, passionate and disciplined, humiliating and exalting, human and transcendent". The topic was prominent with both musicians and poets, being frequently used by troubadours, trouvères and minnesänger. The topic was also popular with major writers, including Dante, Petrarch and Geoffrey Chaucer.

The term "courtly love" was first popularized by Gaston Paris  and has since come under a wide variety of definitions and uses. Its interpretation, origins and influences continue to be a matter of critical debate.

Origin of term
While its origin is uncertain, the term amour courtois ("courtly love") was given greater popularity by Gaston Paris in his 1883 article "Études sur les romans de la Table Ronde: Lancelot du Lac, II: Le conte de la charrette", a treatise inspecting Chrétien de Troyes's Lancelot, the Knight of the Cart (1177). Paris said amour courtois was an idolization and ennobling discipline. The lover (idolizer) accepts the independence of his mistress and tries to make himself worthy of her by acting bravely and honorably (nobly) and by doing whatever deeds she might desire, subjecting himself to a series of tests (ordeals) to prove to her his ardor and commitment. Sexual satisfaction, Paris said, may not have been a goal or even result, but the love was not entirely platonic either, as it was based on sexual attraction.

The term and Paris's definition were soon widely accepted and adopted. In 1936 C. S. Lewis wrote The Allegory of Love further solidifying courtly love as a "love of a highly specialized sort, whose characteristics may be enumerated as Humility, Courtesy, Adultery, and the Religion of Love".

Later, historians such as D. W. Robertson Jr., in the 1960s and John C. Moore and E. Talbot Donaldson in the 1970s, were critical of the term as being a modern invention, Donaldson calling it "The Myth of Courtly Love", because it is not supported in medieval texts. Even though the term "courtly love" does appear only in just one extant Provençal poem (as cortez amors in a late 12th-century lyric by Peire d'Alvernhe), it is closely related to the term fin'amor ("fine love") which does appear frequently in Provençal and French, as well as German translated as hohe Minne. In addition, other terms and phrases  associated with "courtliness" and "love" are common throughout the Middle Ages. Even though Paris used a term with little  support in the contemporaneous literature, it was not a neologism and does usefully describe a particular conception of love and focuses on the courtliness that was at its essence.

Richard Trachsler says that "the concept of courtly literature is linked to the idea of the existence of courtly texts, texts produced and read by men and women sharing some kind of elaborate culture they all have in common". He argues that many of the texts that scholars claim to be courtly also include "uncourtly" texts, and argues that there is no clear way to determine "where courtliness ends and uncourtliness starts" because readers would enjoy texts which were supposed to be entirely courtly without realizing they were also enjoying texts which were uncourtly. This presents a clear problem in the understanding of courtliness.

History

The practice of courtly love developed in the castle life of four regions: Aquitaine, Provence, Champagne and ducal Burgundy, from around the time of the First Crusade (1099). Eleanor of Aquitaine (1124–1204) brought ideals of courtly love from Aquitaine first to the court of France, then to England (she became queen-consort in each of these two realms in succession). Her daughter Marie, Countess of Champagne (1145–1198) brought courtly behavior to the Count of Champagne's court. Courtly love found expression in the lyric poems written by troubadours, such as William IX, Duke of Aquitaine (1071–1126), one of the first troubadour poets.

Poets adopted the terminology of feudalism, declaring themselves the vassal of the lady and addressing her as midons (my lord), which had dual benefits: allowing the poet to use a code name (so as to avoid having to reveal the lady's name) and at the same time flattering her by addressing her as his lord. The troubadour's model of the ideal lady was the wife of his employer or lord, a lady of higher status, usually the rich and powerful female head of the castle. When her husband was away on Crusade or elsewhere she dominated the household and cultural affairs; sometimes this was the case even when the husband was at home. The poet gave voice to the aspirations of the courtier class, for only those who were noble could engage in courtly love. This new kind of love saw nobility not based on wealth and family history, but on character and actions; such as devotion, piety, gallantry, thus appealing to poorer knights who saw an avenue for advancement.

Since at the time some marriages among nobility had little to do with modern perspectives of what constitutes love, courtly love was also a way for nobles to express the love not found in their marriage. "Lovers" in the context of courtly love need not refer to sex, but rather to the act of loving. These "lovers" had short trysts in secret, which escalated mentally, but might not physically.  On the other hand, continual references to beds and sleeping in the lover's arms in medieval sources such as the troubador albas and romances such as Chrétien's Lancelot imply at least in some cases a context of actual sexual intercourse.

By the late 12th century Andreas Capellanus' highly influential work De amore ("Concerning Love") had codified the rules of courtly love. De amore lists such rules as:

 "Marriage is no real excuse for not loving."
 "He who is not jealous cannot love."
 "No one can be bound by a double love."
 "When made public love rarely endures."

Much of its structure and its sentiments derived from Ovid's Ars amatoria.

Andalusian and Islamic influence

Hispano-Arabic literature, as well as Arabic influence on Sicily, provided a further source, in parallel with Ovid, for the early troubadours of Provence—overlooked though this sometimes is in accounts of courtly love. The Arabic poets and poetry of Muslim Spain express similarly oxymoronic views of love as both beneficial and distressing as the troubadours were to do; while the broader European contact with the Islamic world must also be taken into consideration. Given that practices similar to courtly love were already prevalent in Al-Andalus and elsewhere in the Islamic world, it is very likely that Islamic practices influenced the Christian Europeans - especially in southern Europe where classical forms of courtly love first emerged.

According to Gustave E. von Grunebaum, several relevant elements developed in Arabic literature - including such contrasts as sickness/medicine and delight/torment - to characterise the love experience. The notions of "love for love's sake" and "exaltation of the beloved lady" have been traced back to Arabic literature of the 9th and 10th centuries. The Persian psychologist and philosopher Ibn Sina ( 980 – 1037; known as "Avicenna" in Europe) developed the notion of the "ennobling power" of love in the early 11th century in his treatise Risala fi'l-Ishq ("Treatise on Love"). The final element of courtly love, the concept of "love as desire never to be fulfilled", sometimes occurred implicitly in Arabic poetry, but first developed into a doctrine in European literature, in which all four elements of courtly love were present.

According to an argument outlined by Maria Rosa Menocal in The Arabic Role in Medieval Literary History (1987), in 11th-century Spain, a group of wandering poets appeared who would go from court to court, and sometimes travel to Christian courts in southern France, a situation closely mirroring what would happen in southern France about a century later. Contacts between these Spanish poets and the French troubadours were frequent. The metrical forms used by the Spanish poets resembled those later used by the troubadours.

Analysis
The historic analysis of courtly love varies between different schools of historians. That sort of history which views the early Middle Ages dominated by a prudish and patriarchal theocracy views courtly love as a "humanist" reaction to the puritanical views of the Catholic Church. Scholars who endorse this view value courtly love for its exaltation of femininity as an ennobling, spiritual, and moral force, in contrast to the ironclad chauvinism of the first and second estates. The condemnation of courtly love in the beginning of the 13th century by the church as heretical,  is seen by these scholars as the Church's attempt to put down this "sexual rebellion".

However, other scholars note that courtly love was certainly tied to the Church's effort to civilize the crude Germanic feudal codes in the late 11th century. It has also been suggested that the prevalence of arranged marriages required other outlets for the expression of more personal occurrences of romantic love, and thus it was not in reaction to the prudery or patriarchy of the Church but to the nuptial customs of the era that courtly love arose. In the Germanic cultural world a special form of courtly love can be found, namely Minne.

At times, the lady could be a princesse lointaine, a far-away princess, and some tales told of men who had fallen in love with women whom they had never seen, merely on hearing their perfection described, but normally she was not so distant. As the etiquette of courtly love became more complicated, the knight might wear the colors of his lady: where blue or black were sometimes the colors of faithfulness, green could be a sign of unfaithfulness. Salvation, previously found in the hands of the priesthood, now came from the hands of one's lady. In some cases, there were also women troubadours who expressed the same sentiment for men.

Literary convention

The literary convention of courtly love can be found in most of the major authors of the Middle Ages such as Geoffrey Chaucer, John Gower, Dante, Marie de France, Chretien de Troyes, Gottfried von Strassburg and Thomas Malory. The medieval genres in which courtly love conventions can be found include the lyric, the romance and the allegory.

Lyric
Courtly love was born in the lyric, first appearing with Provençal poets in the 11th century, including itinerant and courtly minstrels such as the French troubadours and trouvères, as well as the writers of lays. Texts about courtly love, including lays, were often set to music by troubadours or minstrels. According to scholar Ardis Butterfield, courtly love is "the air which many genres of troubadour song breathe".  Not much is known about how, when, where, and for whom these pieces were performed, but we can infer that the pieces were performed at court by troubadours, trouvères, or the courtiers themselves. This can be inferred because people at court were encouraged or expected to be "courtly" and be proficient in many different areas, including music. Several troubadours became extremely wealthy playing the fiddle and singing their songs about courtly love for a courtly audience.

It is difficult to know how and when these songs were performed because most of the information on these topics is provided in the music itself. One lay, the "Lay of Lecheor", says that after a lay was composed, "Then the lay was preserved / Until it was known everywhere / For those who were skilled musicians / On viol, harp and rote / Carried it forth from that region…" Scholars have to then decide whether to take this description as truth or fiction.

Period examples of performance practice, of which there are few, show a quiet scene with a household servant performing for the king or lord and a few other people, usually unaccompanied. According to scholar Christopher Page, whether or not a piece was accompanied depended on the availability of instruments and people to accompany—in a courtly setting. For troubadours or minstrels, pieces were often accompanied by fiddle, also called a vielle, or a harp. Courtly musicians also played the vielle and the harp, as well as different types of viols and flutes.

This French tradition spread later to the German Minnesänger, such as Walther von der Vogelweide and Wolfram von Eschenbach. It also influenced the Sicilian School of Italian vernacular poetry, as well as Petrarch and Dante.

Romance

The vernacular poetry of the romans courtois, or courtly romances, included many examples of courtly love. Some of them are set within the cycle of poems celebrating King Arthur's court. This was a literature of leisure, directed to a largely female audience for the first time in European history.

Allegory

Allegory is common in the romantic literature of the Middle Ages, and it was often used to interpret what was already written. There is a strong connection between religious imagery and human sexual love in medieval writings.

The tradition of medieval allegory began in part with the interpretation of the Song of Songs in the Bible. Some medieval writers thought that the book should be taken literally as an erotic text; others believed that the Song of Songs was a metaphor for the relationship between Christ and the church and that the book could not even exist without that as its metaphorical meaning. Still others claimed that the book was written literally about sex but that this meaning must be "superseded by meanings related to Christ, to the church and to the individual Christian soul".

Marie de France's lai "Eliduc" toys with the idea that human romantic love is a symbol for God's love when two people love each other so fully and completely that they leave each other for God, separating and moving to different religious environments. Furthermore, the main character's first wife leaves her husband and becomes a nun so that he can marry his new lover.

Allegorical treatment of courtly love is also found in the Roman de la Rose by Guillaume de Lorris and Jean de Meun. In it, a man becomes enamored with an individual rose on a rosebush, attempting to pick it and finally succeeding. The rose represents the female body, but the romance also contains lengthy digressive "discussions on free will versus determinism as well as on optics and the influence of heavenly bodies on human behavior".

Later influence
Through such routes as Capellanus's record of the Courts of Love and the later works of Petrarchism (as well as the continuing influence of Ovid), the themes of courtly love were not confined to the medieval, but appear both in serious and comic forms in early modern Europe. Shakespeare's Romeo and Juliet, for example, shows Romeo attempting to love Rosaline in an almost contrived courtly fashion while Mercutio mocks him for it; and both in his plays and his sonnets the writer can be seen appropriating the conventions of courtly love for his own ends.

Paul Gallico's 1939 novel The Adventures of Hiram Holliday depicts a Romantic modern American consciously seeking to model himself on the ideal Medieval knight. Among other things, when finding himself in Austria in the aftermath of the Anschluss, he saves a Habsburg princess who is threatened by the Nazis, acts towards her in strict accordance with the maxims of courtly love and finally wins her after fighting a duel with her aristocratic betrothed.

Points of controversy

Sexuality
A point of ongoing controversy about courtly love is to what extent it was sexual. All courtly love was erotic to some degree, and not purely platonic—the troubadours speak of the physical beauty of their ladies and the feelings and desires the ladies arouse in them. However, it is unclear what a poet should do: live a life of perpetual desire channeling his energies to higher ends, or physically consummate. Scholars have seen it both ways.

Denis de Rougemont said that the troubadours were influenced by Cathar doctrines which rejected the pleasures of the flesh and that they were metaphorically addressing the spirit and soul of their ladies. Rougemont also said that courtly love subscribed to the code of chivalry, and therefore a knight's loyalty was always to his King before his mistress. Edmund Reiss claimed it was also a spiritual love, but a love that had more in common with Christian love, or caritas. On the other hand, scholars such as Mosché Lazar claim it was adulterous sexual love with physical possession of the lady the desired end.

Many scholars identify courtly love as the "pure love" described in 1184 by Capellanus in De amore libri tres:

Within the corpus of troubadour poems there is a wide range of attitudes, even across the works of individual poets. Some poems are physically sensual, even bawdily imagining nude embraces, while others are highly spiritual and border on the platonic.

The lyrical use of the word midons, borrowed from Guilhem de Poitou, allowed troubadours to address multiple listeners—the lords, men, and women of the court alike. A sort of hermaphroditic code word, or senhan, scholar Meg Bogin writes, the multiple meanings behind this term allowed a covert form of flattery: "By refusing to disclose his lady's name, the troubadour permitted every woman in the audience, notably the patron's wife, to think that it was she; then, besides making her the object of a secret passion—it was always covert romance—by making her his lord he flashed her an aggrandized image of herself: she was more than 'just' a woman; she was a man." These points of multiple meaning and ambiguity facilitated a "coquetry of class", allowing the male troubadours to use the images of women as a means to gain social status with other men, but simultaneously, Bogin suggests, voiced deeper longings for the audience: "In this way, the sexual expressed the social and the social the sexual; and in the poetry of courtly love the static hierarchy of feudalism was uprooted and transformed to express a world of motion and transformation."

Real-world practice
A continued point of controversy is whether courtly love was purely literary or was actually practiced in real life. There are no historical records that offer evidence of its presence in reality. Historian John Benton found no documentary evidence in law codes, court cases, chronicles or other historical documents. However, the existence of the non-fiction genre of courtesy books is perhaps evidence for its practice. For example, according to Christine de Pizan's courtesy book Book of the Three Virtues (c. 1405), which expresses disapproval of courtly love, the convention was being used to justify and cover up illicit love affairs. Courtly love probably found expression in the real world in customs such as the crowning of Queens of Love and Beauty at tournaments. Philip le Bon, in his Feast of the Pheasant in 1454, relied on parables drawn from courtly love to incite his nobles to swear to participate in an anticipated crusade, while well into the 15th century numerous actual political and social conventions were largely based on the formulas dictated by the "rules" of courtly love.

Courts of love

A point of controversy was the existence of "courts of love", first mentioned by Andreas Capellanus. These were supposed courts made up of tribunals staffed by 10 to 70 women who would hear a case of love and rule on it based on the rules of love. In the 19th century, historians took the existence of these courts as fact, but later historians such as Benton noted "none of the abundant letters, chronicles, songs and pious dedications" suggest they ever existed outside of the poetic literature. Likewise, feminist historian Emily James Putnam wrote in 1910 that, secrecy being "among the lover's first duties" in the ideology of courtly love, it is "manifestly absurd to suppose that a sentiment which depended on concealment for its existence should be amenable to public inquiry". According to Diane Bornstein, one way to reconcile the differences between the references to courts of love in the literature, and the lack of documentary evidence in real life, is that they were like literary salons or social gatherings, where people read poems, debated questions of love, and played word games of flirtation.

Courtly love as a response to religion
Theologians of the time emphasized love as more of a spiritual rather than sexual connection. There is a possibility that writings about courtly love were made as a response to the theological ideas about love. Many scholars believe that Andreas Capellanus' work De amore was a satire poking fun at the Church. In that work, Capellanus is supposedly writing to a young man named Walter, and he spends the first two books telling him how to achieve love and setting forth the rules of love. However, in the third book he tells Walter that the only way to live his life correctly is to shun love in favor of God. This sudden change is what has sparked the interest of many scholars, leading some to regard the first two books as satirizing courtly love and only the third book as expressing Capellanus' actual beliefs.

Stages 

(Adapted from Barbara W. Tuchman)
 Attraction to the lady, usually via eyes/glance
 Worship of the lady from afar
 Declaration of passionate devotion
 Virtuous rejection by the lady
 Renewed wooing with oaths of virtue and eternal fealty
 Moans of approaching death from unsatisfied desire (and other physical manifestations of lovesickness)
 Heroic deeds of valor which win the lady's heart
 Consummation of the secret love
 Endless adventures and subterfuges avoiding detection

See also
Cicisbeo
Domnei
Dulcinea

References

Further reading
Duby, Georges. The Knight, the Lady, and the Priest: the Making of Modern Marriage in Medieval France.  Translated by Barbara Bray.  New York: Pantheon Books, 1983..
Frisardi, Andrew. The Young Dante and the One Love: Two Lectures on the Vita Nova. Temenos Academy, 2013. .
Gaunt, Simon. "Marginal Men, Marcabru, and Orthodoxy: The Early Troubadours and Adultery". Medium Aevum 59 (1990): 55–71.
Lewis, C. S. The Allegory of Love: A Study in Medieval Tradition.  Oxford, Clarendon Press, 1936.
Lupack, Alan. The Oxford Guide to Arthurian Literature and Legend. Oxford: University Press, 2005.
Menocal, Maria Rosa. The Arabic Role in Medieval Literary History. Philadelphia: University of Pennsylvania Press, 2003.
Murray, Jacqueline.  Love, Marriage, and Family in the Middle Ages.  Canada: Broadview Press Ltd., 2001.
Newman, Francis X. The Meaning of Courtly Love.  Albany: State University of New York Press, 1968.
Capellanus, Andreas. The Art of Courtly Love. New York: Columbia University Press, 1964.
Schultz, James A. Courtly Love, the Love of Courtliness, and the History of Sexuality'''. Chicago: The University of Chicago Press, 2006.
Busby, Keith, and Christopher Kleinhenz. Courtly Arts and the Art of Courtliness: Selected Papers from the Eleventh      Triennial Congress of the International Courtly Literature Society. Cambridge, MA: D.S. Brewer, 2006. 679–692.

External links
Michael Delahoyde, Courtly Love, Washington State University.
Andreas Capellanus, "The Art of Courtly Love (btw. 1174–1186)", extracts via the Internet Medieval Sourcebook.
"Courtly love". In Encyclopædia Britannica'' Online.
Richard Utz "Were Women Ever Sacred? Some Medieval and Modern Men Would Like Us to Think So,"  medievalists.net, 14 October 2018
Emmanuel-Juste Duits "The meaning of Love in the light of the Courtly Love, extract of the French essay "L'Autre désir"

 
Heterosexuality
Love
Interpersonal relationships
Cultural history of Europe

pl:Trubadurzy (literatura)#Fin' amors – miłość dworska